was a town located in Kawabe District, Akita Prefecture, Japan.

As of 2003, the town had an estimated population of 7,898 and a density of 54.65 persons per km². The total area was 144.51 km².

On January 11, 2005, Yūwa, along with the town of Kawabe, was merged into the expanded city of Akita and no longer exists as an independent municipality.

Climate

References

External links
Akita official website 

Dissolved municipalities of Akita Prefecture